Ramakrishna Beach also known as R K  Beach is situated on the east coast of Bay of Bengal in Visakhapatnam, Andhra Pradesh. It is located near Dolphin's Nose.

RK Beach gets its name from the Ramakrishna Mission ashram situated near the beach.

Gallery

Transportation
APSRTC runs buses to this area along these routes:

See also
List of beaches in India
Kali Temple, Visakhapatnam

References 

Beaches of Andhra Pradesh
Tourist attractions in Visakhapatnam
Geography of Visakhapatnam
Geography of Visakhapatnam district
Uttarandhra